The argus skate (Dentiraja polyommata) is a species of fish in the family Rajidae. It was formerly included in Dipturus or Raja.

References

Marine fish of Eastern Australia
Fauna of Queensland
argus skate
Taxonomy articles created by Polbot